Erika González Haydee (born January 7, 1972) is a retired female freestyle swimmer from Mexico. She represented her native country at the 1992 Summer Olympics in Barcelona, Spain. Her best result there was 25th place (9:17.18) in the Women's 800m Freestyle event.

References
 sports-reference

1972 births
Living people
Mexican female swimmers
Mexican female freestyle swimmers
Swimmers at the 1992 Summer Olympics
Olympic swimmers of Mexico
20th-century Mexican women